Ewoks, also known as Star Wars: Ewoks, is an animated television series featuring the Ewok characters introduced in Star Wars: Episode VI – Return of the Jedi (1983) and further discovered in Caravan of Courage: An Ewok Adventure (1984) and its sequel Ewoks: The Battle for Endor (1985). The series was produced by Canada-based Nelvana on behalf of Lucasfilm and broadcast on ABC, originally with its sister series Droids (as part of The Ewoks and Droids Adventure Hour), and then by itself, as The All-New Ewoks.

Premise
The series centers on the adventures of Wicket W. Warrick and his friends on the forest moon of Endor before the events of the original Star Wars film and Caravan of Courage. Unlike the Ewok films, the characters speak English instead of their native language (though Ewokese phrases and songs are occasionally used). The primary recurring villains are Morag the Tulgah Witch, who had a personal grudge against the tribe's shaman, Master Logray, and the Duloks, a rival species that is related to the Ewoks.

The penultimate episode, "Battle for the Sunstar", which was reaired as the series finale, shows the Ewok heroes leaving the forest moon's surface when they go aboard an Imperial Star Destroyer that has traveled to their system. An Imperial scientist attempts to destroy the Emperor, whose shuttle makes an appearance. The episode has been noted as forming a link with Return of the Jedi, which features the Empire using Endor as its base of operations for the second Death Star.

Cast and characters

The Ewok tribe
Warrick family
 Wicket Wystri Warrick (voiced by Jim Henshaw then Denny Delk) – The youngest brother of the Warrick Family. He is headstrong and determined and often takes the initiative. Wicket really wants to be a great warrior, which often gets him into trouble. Has dark brown fur and wears an orange hood, but wears a green hood in season two.
 Widdle "Willy" Warrick (voiced by John Stocker) – The middle brother of the Warrick Family. Originally called Widdle. He is clumsy, gluttonous and overweight, but exceedingly nice.
 Weechee Warrick (voiced by Greg Swanson) – The eldest brother and the strongest of the Warrick Family.
 Winda Warrick – The youngest child of the Warrick Family.
 Deej Warrick (voiced by Richard Donat) – Father to Wicket, Weechee, Willy and Winda and his wife is Shodu. A very respected warrior of the Ewok tribe. Has dark grey fur and wears a purple hood.
 Shodu Warrick (voiced by Nonnie Griffin then Esther Scott) – Deej's wife and mother to Wicket, Weechee, Willy and Winda.
 Erpham Warrick (voiced by Anthony Parr) – Wicket's great grandfather, once a great warrior for the Ewok tribe and is still looked up to by young Ewoks. Not much is known about Erpham, as he died years ago, but he makes a brief appearance as a ghost when Wicket tries to repair his old battle wagon and instructs him. He was a golden-colored Ewok with a green hood.

Kintaka family
 Princess Kneesaa a Jari Kintaka (voiced by Cree Summer then Jeanne Reynolds) – Younger daughter of Chief Chirpa and Ra-Lee. Often the voice of reason and wisdom to her friends, but usually ends up in just as much trouble. She seems smitten with Wicket. Has white and grey fur and wears a pink hood with a blue gem dangling near her forehead.
 Asha (voiced by Paulina Gillis) – Older daughter of Chief Chirpa and Ra-Lee. Went missing during Ra-Lee's death and eventually was reunited with the Ewoks.
 Chief Chirpa (voiced by George Buza then Rick Cimino) – Widowed father to Kneesaa and Asha. He gives order to the warriors when they are fighting against the Duloks.
 Paploo (voiced by Paul Chato) – Kneesaa's cousin, Great Chief Chirpa's nephew and son to Bozzie. He is close friends with Wicket and Teebo. He sometimes joins in when the young Ewoks go on their adventures. He is older, but often acts with less maturity than the younger Ewoks. Has grey fur, with a white face and wears an orange hood with a feather.
 Bozzie (voice by Pam Hyatt) – Chief Chirpa's sister / sister-in-law and mother to Paploo. She can be very bossy and domineering towards the young Ewoks.

Teebo's family
 Teebo (voiced by Eric Peterson then James Cranna) – Wicket's best friend and the older child of Warok and Batcheela. Fascinated by tales of sorcery and magic becomes his Master Logray's Apprentice. He is a bit of a dreamer, and sometimes a little clumsy. Teebo often lacks discipline, but this is something he learns to master over time from Logray, and eventually becomes a respectful young Ewok. Has ochre fur and he wears a tan, baggy hood with a feather.
 Malani (voiced by Alyson Court) – The younger child of Warok and Batcheela. She is a close friends with Wiley, Nippet and Winda. She has a crush on Wicket and desperately tries to impress him. Has beige fur and wears a blue hood with a flower in it.

Latara's family
 Latara (voiced by Taborah Johnson then Sue Murphy) – Has dark grey fur and wears a yellow hat with a pink feather in it in season one; in season two her fur is light brown and cream, and her hat is heather with a greenish-blue feather. Kneesaa is her best friend. She dreams of being a great musician with her flute, though her main job appears to be looking after her younger siblings. She has a huge crush on Teebo, though he rarely notices it. In the second season, it is the other way round.
 Nippet and Wiley (voiced by Leanne Coppen and Michael .Fantini, respectively) – Latara's younger siblings. At times, Latara has to stay home to watch over them.
 Zephee – The mother of Latara, Nippet and Wiley. She was seen in three episodes: "The Haunted Village", "The Travelling Jindas" and "The Curse of the Jindas".
 Lumat – The father of Latara, Nippet and Wiley. He was seen in two episodes: "The Travelling Jindas" and "The Curse of the Jindas".
Various
 Master Logray (voiced by Doug Chamberlain) – The Ewoks' shaman, and often the dispenser of wisdom and knowledge about the world of Endor.

Others
 King Gorneesh (voiced by Dan Hennessey and then Cody Ryan) – A leader of the Duloks
 Queen Urga (voiced by Melleny Brown) – King Gorneesh's wife and the only female Dulok in the series
 Umwak (voiced by Don Francks) – Gorneesh's right-hand man, a Dulok shaman
 Morag (voiced by Jackie Burroughs) – The Tulgah witch and evil magic counterpart of Logray
 The Phlogs – A race of giants who live on Endor (though they originated offworld)
 Baga – A young gentle bordok and Wicket's personal pet
 The Hanadak – A purple monster which lives in the forest
 The Jindas – A race of canid aliens who live on Endor, and are cursed to an eternal nomadic lifestyle by the Rock Wizard. The Ewoks free them from their curse. Notable Jindas include their leader, Bondo, and magician Trebla.
 The Raich – A tree demon that eats animals and was imprisoned by brave Ewok warriors with a magical hat, made by the Gonster, which was placed on its head, turning it into a tree. He is revived when Wicket takes the hat, but eventually defeated again.
 The Gonster – A two-headed magician whom Ewoks seek out for spells, potions and traps to defeat monsters. His two heads constantly argue.
 The Leaf Queen – A plantlike deity or spirit who dwells on Endor and is entrusted to the care of all its plants. Although kindly, she can be roused to great anger if her plants are harmed.
 Dr. Raygar – An Imperial scientist who wants to steal the Sunstar and use it to overthrow the Emperor. After Kazz eventually learns of his treachery, he is arrested for treason.
 Admiral Kazz – An Imperial officer tasked with assisting Raygar, who does not know his true intentions. Kazz thinks the Sunstar is a myth and considers the Ewoks not worth bothering over.
 PD-28 – An Imperial droid assisting Raygar and Kazz. He eventually tires of working for the abusive Raygar and becomes friends with the Ewoks.
 Poob - A one-time character from the episode "Horville's Hut of Horrors" is a floating green monster that frightens the Ewoks as well as steals their honey and jam.

Production
The series is a follow-up (later stated to be a prequel) to the two Ewok films: Caravan of Courage (1984) and The Battle for Endor (1985), which were themselves spin-offs (and prequels) of Return of the Jedi. The first season of the series was somewhat sophisticated, but in the second, the writing and visual style were both simplified.

Episodes

Season 1 (1985)
The theme song for the first season was written and performed by Taj and Inshirah Mahal.

Season 2 (1986)
With this season, advertised as The All-New Ewoks, episodes are now shorted the 11-minute format meaning two segments per half-hour (with the exceptions of "The Raich", "Night of the Stranger", "The Season Scepter" and "Battle for the Sunstar"). This season introduced a new theme song, "Friends Together, Friends Forever", written and performed by Patrick Gleeson.

Broadcast and home media
Ewoks was broadcast on ABC, originally with its sister series Droids (as part of The Ewoks and Droids Adventure Hour), and then by itself, as The All-New Ewoks. The series ran for two seasons of 13 half-hour episodes between 1985 and 1986 and was later shown in reruns on Sci-Fi Channel's Cartoon Quest.

Almost all of the episodes (except for "The Three Lessons"  and "Prow Beaten / Baga's Rival") were released on VHS in the 1980s and 1990s, most notably the UK PAL releases over six cassettes (Ewoks 1–6), which had the opening sequences and credits edited out. On April 2, 2021, the entire series was released on Disney+.

During the making of the Star Wars prequel trilogy, its producer, Rick McCallum, oversaw two direct-to-video compilation films, each compiled from four episodes of the series. The first, The Haunted Village, was released on VHS in 1997. The second, Tales from the Endor Woods, was released by 20th Century Fox Home Entertainment in 2004 on a DVD titled Star Wars: Animated Adventures – Ewoks (which also features The Haunted Village). The newer film includes narration from "Adult Wicket" (voiced by Alex Lindsay).

Reception
According to David Perlmutter, Ewoks was "unremarkable both technically and creatively." Screen Rant says the series was made at a time when "television executives had no idea what constituted good children's animated television", comparing it to series like The Smurfs, Snorks, or Care Bears. SyFy Wire calls the series "more a marketing ploy for Lucasfilm than a worthwhile extension of the franchise ... designed to sell toys, cereals, and action figures", though mentions that it "featured a few surprisingly entertaining installments that appealed to both parents and kids, particularly the penultimate episode, 'Battle for the Sunstar.'"

Some controversy has resulted from the Ewoks' apparent mastery of English while appearing not to speak the language in the Ewok films or Return of the Jedi (which are set some years later).

Legacy
Elements from the series are featured in Star Wars reference media, such as A Guide to the Star Wars Universe and the Star Wars Encyclopedia. A Dulok was shown on Coruscant in Chapter 21 of the 2D animated Clone Wars (2003). Ewoks was excluded from canon status in 2014, but some elements appear in the canon Ultimate Star Wars (2015) and later reference books, as well as the canon web series Star Wars Forces of Destiny (2018).

The series' opening titles are briefly featured in an episode of Stranger Things fourth season (2022).

Merchandising and media

Action figures
In 1985, Kenner Products produced a series of action figures based on the series. A second wave of figures were prototyped but ultimately cancelled due to poor sales of the initial wave. Several previously released Ewok themed vehicles, play sets, and accessories were advertised on the card backs of the figures but were curiously never offered in Ewoks Cartoon branded packaging.

Comics
In 1985, Star Comics, an imprint of Marvel, published a bi-monthly Ewoks comic based on the animated series. It ran for two years, with a total of 14 issues. Like the TV series, it was aimed towards a younger audience and produced parallel to a comic spun off from Droids. Issue #10 of Ewoks continued the "Lost in Time" crossover story from Droids #4. Additionally, Spanish comics publisher Editorial Gepsa produced two-page Ewoks comics as part of an anthology series.

References
Footnotes

Citations

Sources

Further reading
 Star Wars Insider #27

External links

 
 
 An informative fan site
 An article from the Star Wars Insider on the series
 A history of home video releases of Ewoks
 

Ewoks
1985 American television series debuts
1986 American television series endings
1980s American animated television series
1985 Canadian television series debuts
1986 Canadian television series endings
1980s Canadian animated television series
1980s American science fiction television series
American Broadcasting Company original programming
American children's animated space adventure television series
American children's animated science fantasy television series
Canadian children's animated space adventure television series
Canadian children's animated science fantasy television series
Star Comics titles
Ewoks
Television series by Nelvana
Television series by Lucasfilm
Television series by 20th Century Fox Television
Animated television shows based on films
English-language television shows
Animated television series about extraterrestrial life